Ann Behrenfors (born 8 February 1961) is a Swedish equestrian. She competed in two events at the 1992 Summer Olympics.

References

External links
 

1961 births
Living people
Swedish female equestrians
Swedish dressage riders
Olympic equestrians of Sweden
Equestrians at the 1992 Summer Olympics
Sportspeople from Östergötland County